Somewhere Amazing is a 2015 Italian drama film written and directed  by  	Giorgia Cecere and starring Isabella Ragonese and Alessio Boni.

Plot 
Lucia works in her own florist shop in the center of Asti. Her husband Andrea is a business executive and Tommaso, their teenage son, reminds her of herself when she was young. A foreign boy Feysal who sells various objects on the street starts to cast a light on things that Lucia never wanted to pay attention to - for example about Andrea. Slowly she starts to realise that her life is not as perfect as she thought it was.

Cast 

Isabella Ragonese as Lucia
Alessio Boni as Andrea
Piera Degli Esposti as  Adriana
Paolo Sassanelli as  Angelo
  as  Carla
 Michele Griffo as  Tommaso
 Faysal Abbaoui as  Feysal
 Teresa Acerbis as  Lucia's Mother

See also 
 List of Italian films of 2015

References

External links 

2015 drama films
2015 films
Italian drama films
2010s Italian-language films
2010s Italian films